Saperda ohbayashii is a species of beetle in the family Cerambycidae. It was described by Podany in 1963. It is known from Japan.

References

ohbayashii
Beetles described in 1963